To the Lighthouse is a 1983 television film based on the 1927 novel by Virginia Woolf. It was adapted by Hugh Stoddart, directed by Colin Gregg, and produced by Alan Shallcross.

Cast
The cast included:

 Rosemary Harris as Mrs Ramsay
 Michael Gough as Mr Ramsay
 Kenneth Branagh as Charles Tansley
 Suzanne Bertish as Lily Briscoe

Critical reception
Reviewing the film in The New York Times, John J. O'Connor began by noting, "Few works of literature would seem to lend themselves less readily to dramatization than Virginia Woolf's To the Lighthouse, but the BBC and Colin Gregg Ltd. have made the effort and the result is very special indeed"; although, he added, "Purists should be warned that changes have been made". He concluded by writing, "Colin Gregg's direction relies openly and rewardingly on the cool distancing manner of Ingmar Bergman in remaining faithful to the tone and mood of Mrs. Woolf. With Alan Shallcross as producer, the admirable dedication of all concerned is apparent throughout."

To the Lighthouse  was nominated for a British Academy of Film and Television Arts (BAFTA) award in the Best Single Drama category in 1984.

References

External links

1983 television films
1983 films
Films based on British novels
Virginia Woolf in performing arts
1983 drama films
1980s British films
British drama television films
1980s English-language films